is a Japanese manga series written and illustrated by Sato Fujiwara. It started serialization on Flex Comix's web manga FlexComix Blood on August 10, 2007. An anime adaptation premiered on October 1, 2009 in Japan. The series has been licensed by Sentai Filmworks and released in North America with English subtitles on December 14, 2010, and dubbed in English on December 31, 2013 by Seraphim Digital.

Plot
Junpei Kōsaka is a second-year high school student who is allergic to cats, and because of this he hates the sight of them. As luck would have it, his high school crush, Kaede Mizuno, absolutely adores cats. One day, while walking home from school, Junpei kicks an empty can and unfortunately breaks the local neko-jizō-sama (guardian deity of cats). He finds he can now understand what cats are saying, including his family's own ill-tempered cat, Nyamsus. However, to atone for the broken statue, he must now grant 100 wishes to cats, or he will turn into a cat himself and die from his own allergy.

Characters

Human characters

Junpei is the protagonist of Nyan Koi! who has a chronic allergy and, thereby, resentment of cats. Ironically, everyone around him seems to love cats, including his mother and sister (which does not help his predicament). To complicate matters, he accidentally destroys the statue of a cat deity, and to atone for it, he must make use of his new-found ability of communicating with cats to fulfill the requests of one hundred cats. If he does not atone properly, he will be transformed into a cat, and die due to his allergy. Furthermore, should anyone find out about the curse, not only will the curse get stronger and enact faster, but the person who found out will become more unlucky and accident prone, such seen when Akari told Junpei that she knew he was cursed and almost fell down the temple stair. His love interest is Kaede Mizuno, but is starting to become aware of the feelings of the other girls around him.

Kaede is Junpei Kōsaka's classmate and crush who is initially oblivious of his feelings for her. She is described as athletic, smart and cute. Despite loving cats, her family owns four dogs, and cats tend to avoid her as she not only carries their smell, but gets overenthusiastic in handling them. This is mainly due to her only having experience with the big dogs her family owns and not realizing that cats are much different creatures. She tends to be airheaded, react to things naively and misunderstand people. Kaede meets Junpei when she falls on him from a tree trying to rescue a kitten that later climbs down itself. As a member of the track and field team, Kaede can run faster and longer than the average person, especially Junpei. She later develops feelings for Kōsaka.

Kanako is Junpei Kōsaka's classmate and childhood friend who has a fondness for cats and Junpei. She is introduced in the series wearing manba make-up, which is a result of Kanako misunderstanding Junpei's intention of showing her Nyamsus doll to a girl. During Tokiwa High School's cultural festival, her makeup is washed off. Later, Junpei passes on the caba cat Kumaneko's thanks for taking care of him and Kanako reconciles with Junpei when he reveals that he still has Kanako's doll. Kanako stops wearing her make-up and she becomes popular with Tokiwa's male students. She has a well-endowed body, and is not afraid to flaunt it, but often gets unwanted attention and is groped by Nagi Ichinose. Kanako is very forceful and often gets Junpei to purchase her food and merchandise at his own expense. Despite being romantically attracted to Junpei since childhood, her brash, quick-tempered personality frequently gets in the way of communicating her feelings for him. Kanako has a younger brother named Toru, who is dating Junpei's younger sister.

Nagi Ichinose is Kaede's senior on the track team and heir of a powerful yakuza family from Kyoto. Like Kaede, she can run far and fast easily without getting winded. Despite being a girl, she started assuming a more masculine behavior after she was rejected by her first love, who mistakenly assumed she was a guy because of her boyish appearance and personality. Even Junpei thought she was a boy at first when she confronted him for approaching Kaede (who she feels needs protecting.) However, after Junpei comforts her, she falls in love with him and resorts to extreme actions, such as attempting to transfer into his class despite being a year older, just to be at his side. She suffers from a fear of lightning, the fear stemming from the fact that she witnessed her grandfather being struck by lightning on several occasions. She punctuates her sudden appearances by sexually harassing Kanako (often involving groping her breasts). She has a rare condition where she gets drunk from drinking soft drinks, which seems to give her romantic-like, lesbian-like, affectionate feelings towards other girls including Kaede and Kanako. She is called "Ichinose-senpai" by Kaede. She has a male longhair cat named Josephine, who speaks in Kansai-ben accent and wears a small cape. Her cat is "married" to her older brother's female cat.

Kotone is the elder of the Kirishima twins. She, along with her sister, are the daughters of the Buddhist monk in the temple behind the cat statue Junpei that broke. Despite her gentle and sweet outward demeanor, she is interested in Junpei mainly because of his misfortunes and can be considered sadistic, delusional, and an obsessive stalker. In the anime, she is shown to have had this sort of behavior towards a teacher, even at a young age. She exhibits yandere tendencies as she becomes jealous if another girl gets too close to Junpei. She's hinted to have feelings for Kōsaka. She is aware of Kaede's feelings for Junpei. Like her sister, she is aware of Junpei's curse and tries to find ways to help or encourage him to help more cats. She tends to bring the family's female black cat, Noir, who has a bit of a prima-donna attitude, wherever she goes. Some of this attitude is due to how Kotone's father practically ignored her and gave her common cat food while lavishing attention and gourmet cat food on Tama.

Akari is Kotone's younger twin sister. She, along with her sister, know that Junpei is cursed. They do not become cursed themselves as they have innate anti-magic abilities, but only for self-protection. She is a tsundere, and has the ability to sense the supernatural. She is extremely possessive of Kotone. In the anime, Akari is revealed to have been asocial as a child, thus causing her present awkwardness in dealing with people. The reason for this is because of her strong spiritual affinity, and she subconsciously avoided the other children. Despite her difficulties dealing with strangers, she seems to have no problem interacting with Junpei (though mostly due to her mistaken perception that he's becoming too close to Kotone). In contrast to her sister, she is aware of Kanako's feelings towards Junpei. Slowly, she too begins to harbor feelings for Junpei but tries to conceal them.

Keizo is a Buddhist monk at the temple in which the cat deity dwells. He is the father of Kotone and Akari. Despite being a monk, he often dons disguises to visit cabaret clubs. Keizo found Tama shivering outside in the cold and took him in, but began to spoil him once he discovered that Tama was an extremely rare male calico cat; this angered Noir, the family's other pet cat.

Chizuru is a third-year college student working as a mail carrier for Japan Post Service when she is not in class. She has a bad sense of direction and frequently ends up getting lost. She is somewhat perverse and enjoys teasing Junpei. She seems to take a liking to Junpei after he helped her deliver letters in a district she got lost in. Junpei eventually takes up a part-time job at the post office during the winter to help raise money to repair the cat statue and they deliver the mail together.

Suzu is Junpei's younger sister and is in her first year of middle school. She pokes fun at Junpei when he is with girls and gossips with her mother about the girls Junpei is with. She is a great cat lover and loves Nyamsus very much. It is shown that she is dating Sumiyoshi's younger brother and is not embarrassed about the relationship.

Shizue is Junpei and Suzu's mother. Her husband left the family many years ago for unknown reasons, causing her to raise her kids by herself; she also a quite supporting mother, the more girls linked together with Junpei, the more happier she and Suzu are.

Feline characters

A large, fat cat owned by Junpei's family, and the one who brings to him the requests of cats in need of his help. She is well known and most cats around Junpei's neighborhood see her as an older sister figure. She reveals (to herself) that she is very grateful for Junpei since he gave her a home by begging his mother to take her in despite his allergies. Nyamsus greatly cares for Junpei but shows this subtly like when she claims ownership of the living room so as to prevent Junpei from sleeping in it and so catching a cold. It is revealed that Nyamsus is the kitten that Kaede had left in a very nice comfortable box with a sign saying she needed a home due to not being able to keep a cat with all the dogs at her home.

A small cat owned by the Buddhist monk Keizo Kirishima, in charge of the temple whose statue was broken by Junpei, and an acquaintance of Nyamsus, who also brings requests to him. He goes about the neighborhood and tells the other cats around about Junpei, which is part of the reason why the local cats know so much about him. He is an extremely rare male calico cat.

A black cat owned by the Kirishima twins. She received less attention once Tama was adopted into the family, and became jealous of his near-royal treatment as a rare breed. Still, the two share a fondness for one another, but easily become argumentative. The reason for her conflict with Tama is suspected to be his adoration of Nyamsus, and is heavily hinted that she is jealous of Nyamsus.

Josephine is a cat owned by Nagi. He is dressed up in an elegant manner, and speaks in a Kansai dialect. He wishes for Nagi to shed her masculine behavior, and thus asks Junpei to help her fall in love once again. He has a wife who lives in Kyoto.

Komasa's father. He cheated his pregnant wife in Kyoto with another cat, that's why he had been staying with Josephine at Tokiwa town. After he heard that Komasa was born, Masa asked for Junpei's help to bring him back to Kyoto.

Masa's son. He was born while Masa was staying in Tokiwa at Josephine's house; He was lost at the theater village and saved by Junpei, Kaede and Sumiyoshi. Both Masa & Komasa were happily reunited after that.

Cindy is the wife of Josephine. She at the Ichinose clan's main house in Kyoto.

A fat yellow cat who lives next door to Junpei. His master sees a commercial about obese cats on TV and decides to put Chatora on a diet. Chatara refuses, at first, to accept this change in his food from human food down to dry cat food. He asks Junpei for help to get rid of this idea in his master about his diet but Junpei is able to put some sense in Chatora that his master cares about his health; He finally accepts his master's wishes in going along with this diet but comes to Junpei's house once in a while to get more food.

Episode list

Theme songs
Opening Theme: 
"Nyanderful! (にゃんだふる！)" by Yui Sakakibara

Ending Theme: 
"Strawberry ~Amaku Setsunai Namida~ (Strawberry～甘く切ない涙～)" by Asami Imai

Reception
Theron Martin from Anime News Network gave the English sub of the anime a C+ rating. In his review he says that the anime doesn't stand out compared to other series where harem is a genre. He goes on to say though that it tries to go with "some unusual twists". Chris Beveridge from The Fandom Post gave the anime a B rating. He calls the humor "cute", and that the ending builds up to something nice despite the manga not being finished.

References

Manga
Nyan Koi! manga volumes by Sato Fujiwara. Original Japanese version published by Flex Comix

External links
Nyan Koi! Official Blog from Flex Comix 
Flex Comic's Website for Nyan Koi!  
Anime official website 

2007 manga
Anime International Company
Anime series
Comic Meteor manga
Fictional cats
FlexComix Blood and FlexComix Next manga
Harem anime and manga
Japanese webcomics
Romantic comedy anime and manga
School life in anime and manga
Sentai Filmworks
Shōnen manga
TBS Television (Japan) original programming
Webcomics in print